Kellyanne Elizabeth Conway (née Fitzpatrick; born January 20, 1967) is an American political consultant and pollster, who served as Senior Counselor to the President in the administration of Donald Trump from 2017 to 2020. She was previously Trump's campaign manager, having been appointed in August 2016; Conway is the first woman to have run a successful U.S. presidential campaign.

She has previously held roles as campaign manager and strategist in the Republican Party, and was formerly president and CEO of the Polling Company/WomanTrend.

Conway lived in Trump World Tower from 2001 to 2008 and conducted private polls for Trump in late 2013 when he was considering running for governor of New York. In the 2016 Republican presidential primaries, Conway initially endorsed Ted Cruz and chaired a pro-Cruz political action committee. After Cruz withdrew from the race, Trump appointed Conway as a senior advisor and later campaign manager. On December 22, 2016, Trump announced that Conway would join his administration as counselor to the president. On November 29, 2017, Attorney General Jeff Sessions announced that Conway would oversee White House efforts to combat the opioid overdose epidemic.

After Trump's inauguration, Conway was embroiled in a series of controversies: using the phrase "alternative facts" to describe fictitious and disproven attendance numbers for Trump's inauguration; speaking multiple times of a "Bowling Green massacre" that never occurred; and claiming that Michael Flynn had the full confidence of the president hours before he was dismissed. Members of Congress from both parties called for an investigation of an apparent ethics violation after she publicly endorsed commercial products associated with the president's daughter, Ivanka Trump. In June 2019, the U.S. Office of Special Counsel recommended that Conway be fired for "unprecedented" multiple violations of the Hatch Act of 1939.

In August 2020, Conway left the administration. This came after months of a public feud between herself and her teenage daughter, Claudia, who lambasted her in the media, politically and personally, and threatened to seek legal emancipation.

Early life
Kellyanne Elizabeth Fitzpatrick was born on January 20, 1967, in the Atco section of Waterford Township, New Jersey, to Diane (née DiNatale) and John Fitzpatrick. Conway's father had German, English, and Irish ancestry, while her mother is of Italian descent; John Fitzpatrick owned a small trucking company, and Diane worked at a bank. Conway's parents divorced when she was three, and she was raised by her mother, grandmother, and two unmarried aunts in Atco. She graduated from St. Joseph High School in 1985 as class valedictorian.  In high school, she also sang in the choir, played field hockey, worked on floats for parades, and was a cheerleader. A 1992 New Jersey Organized Crime Commission report identified Conway's grandfather, Jimmy "The Brute" DiNatale, as a mob associate of the Philadelphia crime family; DiNatale did not reside with Conway's grandmother, Conway, and the rest of her family. Conway's cousin, Mark DeMarco, has stated that while in high school, Conway ordered members of the football team to stop bullying him; according to DeMarco, the bullying stopped. Her family is Catholic.

Conway credits her experience working for eight summers on a blueberry farm in Hammonton, New Jersey, for teaching her a strong work ethic. "The faster you went, the more money you'd make," she said. At age 16, she won the New Jersey Blueberry Princess pageant. At age 20, she won the World Champion Blueberry Packing competition: "Everything I learned about life and business started on that farm."

Conway graduated magna cum laude with a Bachelor of Arts in political science from Trinity College, Washington, D.C. (now Trinity Washington University), where she was elected to Phi Beta Kappa. She earned a Juris Doctor with honors from the George Washington University Law School in 1992. After graduation, she served as a judicial clerk for Judge Richard A. Levie of the Superior Court of the District of Columbia.

Early career
Conway entered the polling business when she was in law school, working as a research assistant for Wirthlin Group, a Republican polling firm. After graduating, she initially considered working for a law firm, but chose to work for Luntz Research Companies instead. While a student at Trinity College, she had met and become friends with Frank Luntz, the founder, on a year abroad at Oxford University. In 1995, she founded her own firm, the Polling Company. Conway's company has consulted on consumer trends, often trends regarding women. Conway's clients have included Vaseline, American Express and Hasbro.

In the 1990s, Conway, along with other young conservative women Laura Ingraham, Barbara Olson, and Ann Coulter, helped turn punditry into "stylish stardom" in both Washington and cable television and credited with setting forth Washington D.C.'s "sexual awakening." In another review of the era in the capital, Conway (then known as Fitzpatrick) put it that her "broad mind and small waist have not switched places". Conway, Ingraham, and Coulter were sometimes called "pundettes" and appeared on Bill Maher's Politically Incorrect.

Conway worked for Representative Jack Kemp; Senator Fred Thompson; Vice President Dan Quayle; Speaker of the House Newt Gingrich; and Representative (later Vice President) Mike Pence. She worked as the senior advisor to Gingrich during his unsuccessful 2012 United States presidential election campaign. Another client in 2012 was U.S. Senate candidate Todd Akin.

In addition to her political opinion research work, Conway has directed demographic and attitudinal survey projects for trade associations and private companies, including American Express, ABC News, Major League Baseball, and Ladies Home Journal. Her firm The Polling Company also includes WomanTrend, a research and consulting division.

Conway has appeared as a commentator on polling and the political scene, having appeared on ABC, CBS, NBC, PBS, CNN, MSNBC, NY1, and the Fox News Channel, in addition to various radio programs. She received the Washington Post's "Crystal Ball" award for accurately predicting the outcome of the 2004 election.

Conway has been criticized as a spin doctor of high prominence, particularly in her role as cable TV spokesperson for the Trump Administration. She has been lauded as a "Trump whisperer." As part of their long-running feud with Donald Trump, the MSNBC show Morning Joe publicly "banned" Conway in February 2017.

2016 presidential election

Ted Cruz support and endorsement
When the 2016 election campaigns got underway, Conway had been acquainted with Donald Trump for years, because she lived in Trump World Tower from 2001 to 2008 and sat on the condo board. Yet she initially endorsed Ted Cruz in the 2016 Republican presidential primary and chaired a pro-Cruz political action committee known as Keep the Promise I, which was almost entirely funded by businessman Robert Mercer. Conway's organization criticized Republican presidential candidate Donald Trump as "extreme" and "not a conservative". On January 25, 2016, Conway criticized Trump as "a man who seems to be offending his way to the nomination." On January 26, Conway criticized Trump's use of eminent domain, saying "Donald Trump has literally bulldozed over the little guy to get his way."

In mid-June 2016, Cruz suspended his campaign and Conway left.

Trump campaign
On July 1, 2016, Trump announced that he had hired Conway for a senior advisory position on his presidential campaign. Conway was expected to advise Trump on how to better appeal to female voters. On August 19, following the resignation of Paul Manafort, Trump named Conway the campaign's third campaign manager. She served in this capacity for 10 weeks, through the November 8 general election, and was the first woman to successfully run an American presidential campaign, and the first woman to run a Republican general election presidential campaign. Since October 2016, Conway has been satirized on Saturday Night Live, in which she is portrayed by Kate McKinnon. In a January 2017 interview, Conway acknowledged the SNL parody by noting that, "Kate McKinnon clearly sees the road to the future runs through me and not Hillary."

Presidential transition

On November 10, 2016, Conway tweeted publicly that Trump had offered her a White House job. "I can have any job I want", she said on November 28. On November 24, Conway tweeted that she was "Receiving deluge of social media & private comms re: Romney. Some Trump loyalists warn against Romney as sec of state" with a link to an article on Trump loyalists' discontent for the 2012 nominee. Conway told CNN she was only tweeting what she has shared with President-elect Donald Trump and Vice President-elect Mike Pence in private.

On November 28, two top sources at the Trump transition team told media outlets that Trump "was furious" at Conway for media comments she made on Trump administration cabinet appointments. The following day, however, Trump released a written statement stating that the campaign sources were wrong and that he had expressed disappointment at her critical comments on Romney. CNBC reported on November 28 that senior officials in the Trump transition "have reportedly been growing frustrated by Conway's failure to become a team player."

On December 1, Conway appeared with senior aides of the Trump campaign at Harvard Kennedy School for a forum on the 2016 presidential race; the quadrennial post-presidential election forum has been held at the School of Government since 1972. Sitting across from Conway were senior Clinton campaign aides, including Clinton's campaign manager Robby Mook. As tempers began to flare, the forum escalated into a "shouting match"; during one exchange, Clinton senior strategist Joel Benenson said "The fact of the matter is that more Americans voted for Hillary Clinton than for Donald Trump." Conway replied to Benenson while looking at the Trump aides: "Hey, guys, we won. You don't have to respond. He was the better candidate. That's why he won."

In early December, Conway claimed that Hillary Clinton supporters were making death threats against her. Consequently, Trump assigned Secret Service to protect her. Conway gave up her Secret Service protection in September 2017 due to "reduction in threats."

White House advisor

Inauguration fight 

According to eyewitnesses, Conway allegedly punched a tuxedo-clad man at an exclusive inauguration ball just hours after Trump was sworn in as president. In an attempt to break up a scuffle, Conway stepped between two men, but they would not break up the fight, and Conway apparently punched one of them in the face with closed fists at least three times.

It was not immediately clear what triggered the fistfight and a Trump spokeswoman did not return a request for comment.

"Alternative facts"
During a Meet the Press interview two days after Trump's presidential inauguration, Conway used the phrase "alternative facts" to defend statements made by White House press secretary Sean Spicer regarding the inauguration's crowd size. Conway's phrase reminded liberal-leaning commentators of "Newspeak", an obfuscatory language style that is a key element of the society portrayed in George Orwell's dystopian novel 1984. Soon after Conway's interview, sales of the book had increased by 9,500%, which The New York Times and others attributed to Conway's use of the phrase, making it the number-one bestseller on Amazon.com.

The Guardian noted that "[a] search of several online legal dictionaries, however, did not yield any results for the term."

Bowling Green massacre

On February 2, 2017, Conway appeared in a television news show interview on Hardball with Chris Matthews. In order to justify President Trump's immigration ban, she referenced an event allegedly perpetrated by Iraqi terrorists she termed the "Bowling Green massacre". Such an event never took place. Vox suggested Conway was referring to the 2011 arrest of two Iraqi refugees in Bowling Green, Kentucky. Conway stated the next day that she meant to say "Bowling Green terrorists", both of whom had pleaded guilty to carrying out and supporting attacks on American soldiers in Iraq. There was never any suggestion that they had planned to carry out attacks in the United States.

On February 5, 2017, New York University journalism professor Jay Rosen argued that, given repeated misstatements of fact, Conway should cease being booked as a guest on television news shows. CNN opted not to book Conway as a guest that day because of what the network said were "serious questions about her credibility."

Ethics violations under the Hatch Act
The Hatch Act of 1939 states that federal government employees must not advocate their political beliefs while representing a public office. Violating such a law can result in such an employee being removed from public office, but not jailed. Conway has been accused of breaching the act on several occasions.

Commercial promotion
On February 9, 2017, during an appearance on Fox & Friends, Conway discussed department store Nordstrom's decision to drop products supplied by Ivanka Trump's business. "Go buy Ivanka's stuff is what I would tell you", said Conway; she elaborated "It's a wonderful line. I own some of it. I'm going to give a free commercial here: Go buy it today, everybody. You can find it online". Within hours, two organizations filed formal ethics complaints against Conway for violating federal law prohibiting use of a federal position "for the endorsement of any product, service or enterprise". Public Citizen asked the Office of Governmental Ethics (OGE) to investigate, saying that Conway's remarks reflected "an on-going careless regard of the conflicts of interest laws and regulations of some members of the Trump family and Trump Administration". The group's president, Robert Weissman, declared, "Since she said it was an advertisement, that both eliminates any question about whether outsiders are unfairly reading into what's being said, and two, it makes clear that wasn't an inadvertent remark". Citizens for Responsibility and Ethics in Washington filed a similar complaint with the OGE and with the White House Counsel's Office; the group's executive director, Noah Bookbinder, stated "This seems to us to be about as clear-cut a violation as you can find".

Harvard constitutional law professor Laurence Tribe told The New York Times that "You couldn't think of a clearer example of violating the ban of using your government position as kind of a walking billboard for products or services offered by a private individual," adding "She is attempting quite crudely to enrich Ivanka and therefore the president's family." Chris Lu, deputy secretary of labor in the Obama administration, complained to Jason Chaffetz, chair of the United States House Committee on Oversight and Government Reform, that Conway had violated federal ethics laws, also saying on Twitter that, under Obama, "If we did what @KellyannePolls did, we would've been fired". Richard Painter, chief ethics attorney for George W. Bush, declined to say whether he thought Conway's statements broke the law, but that such actions would not have been tolerated in the Bush administration. "The events of the past week demonstrate that there is no intent on the part of the president, his family or the White House staff to make meaningful distinctions between his official capacity as president and the Trump family business". At the regularly scheduled afternoon press briefing, Sean Spicer told reporters that "Kellyanne has been counseled, and that's all we are going to go with ... She's been counseled on the subject, and that's it." In a direct rebuke to Spicer, Conway tweeted that Trump "likes 'counselor' more than 'counseled.'"

Conway's comments drew bipartisan Congressional condemnation. Chaffetz, a Republican, called them "clearly over the line" and "unacceptable". Cummings, a Democrat and the committee's ranking member, called them "jaw-dropping". Both Chaffetz and Cummings wrote the OGE on February 9, 2017, requesting that Conway's behavior be investigated and that the office recommend "suggested disciplinary action, if warranted".

Political commentary
On November 24, 2017, Walter Shaub, the former director of the OGE, said that he filed an ethics complaint against Conway. He argued that Conway violated the Hatch Act when she criticized Doug Jones, a candidate in the 2017 U.S. Senate special election in Alabama. On March 6, 2018, the U.S. Office of Special Counsel (OSC)led by Trump appointee Henry Kernerissued its final report, determining that Conway violated the Hatch Act in two television interviews in November and December 2017.

Conway continued to make frequent television appearances and comment on political topics. In May 2019, Conway declared: "If you’re trying to silence me through the Hatch Act, it's not going to work ... Let me know when the jail sentence starts".

On June 13, 2019, the OSC formally recommended that Conway be removed from federal service, citing multiple Hatch Act violations by Conway since the preparation of its 2018 report, "by disparaging Democratic presidential candidates while speaking in her official capacity during television interviews and on social media". The OSC noted her criticism from February to May 2019 of candidates such as Amy Klobuchar, Bernie Sanders, Beto O'Rourke, Cory Booker, Elizabeth Warren, Joe Biden and Kirsten Gillibrand, and also called her violations "egregious, notorious, and ongoing". The OSC noted that this was the first time they "had to issue multiple reports to the President concerning Hatch Act violations by the same individual". In an interview, Kerner characterized his agency's recommendation as unprecedented, adding, "You know what else is unprecedented? Kellyanne Conway’s behavior."

Due to Conway's status as a presidential appointee, the OSC was unable to take any steps to implement its recommendation, but it was submitted to the President for consideration. The White House immediately rejected the finding and demanded that it be withdrawn by the OSC. Trump said he thought the recommendation was "very unfair, it's called freedom of speech."

On June 26, 2019, Conway did not appear at a hearing by the House Committee on Oversight and Reform, leading that committee to issue a subpoena for her. At that hearing, Special Counsel Henry Kerner testified that Conway had been found guilty of two Hatch Act violations in 2018 and 11 in 2019. In comparison, during the eight years of the Obama administration, only two federal employees were found guilty of violating the Hatch Act, with one violation each.

Michael Flynn comments and week-long suspension from television

On February 13, 2017, Conway claimed that former national security advisor Michael Flynn had the president's "full confidence". Hours later, Flynn resigned. The following day, Conway claimed Flynn had offered to resign, but White House Press Secretary Sean Spicer said Trump had asked Flynn for his resignation. It was then reported that Conway had allegedly leaked negative stories about Spicer to the press.

Conway came under widespread criticism because her comments about Flynn had been so inaccurate. On February 15, 2017, Washington Post columnist Jennifer Rubin said Conway should be banned from future television appearances. "In recent days, George Stephanopoulos and Matt Lauer blasted her directly, essentially calling her a fabulist. Given all that, it would be irresponsible for any news show to put her out there, suggesting she really does not know what is going on at any given moment", Rubin wrote. Also on February 15 the MSNBC news show Morning Joe officially banned her from future appearances. The show's primary host Joe Scarborough said the decision to ban Conway from the show was based on her being "out of the loop" and "in none of the key meetings". He added "She's not briefed. She's just saying things just to get in front of the TV to prove her relevance." The show's co-host Mika Brzezinski said, "I don't believe in fake news, or information that is not true... every time I've ever seen her on television, something's askew, off or incorrect."

For the week following her Flynn comments she did not appear on any television shows, and it was reported that the White House had sidelined Conway. Denying the report, White House spokesperson Sarah Huckabee Sanders told CNNMoney that Conway was going to make many appearances during the week, and Conway told CNN journalist Dylan Byers that she would be appearing on Fox News that evening. The week-long absence from television finally ended when she appeared on an episode of Hannity during the Conservative Political Action Conference.

Oval Office couch photograph 

Conway came under criticism when she was photographed sitting on an Oval Office couch with her legs folded beneath hershoes pressed against the upholsteryduring President Trump's meeting with leaders from historically black colleges and universities. Some observers suggested the sitting position was a sign of disrespect and a lack of decorum. Body language expert Patti Wood asserted that Conway's posture was not only rude, but "rather sexual", and a sign that she "doesn't have to follow the rules" because she was "buddies with Trump." Conway later addressed the controversy with Lou Dobbs, saying that she was asked to take photographs of the meeting from a certain angle and that she certainly meant "no disrespect." She also blamed the media for the ensuing furor.

Political views

Conway views herself as a Generation X conservative. Conway is anti-abortion, saying in 1996: "We're pro-life. The fetus beat us. We grew up with sonograms. We know life when we see it." She spoke at the 2017 March for Life, an annual rally protesting abortion and Roe v. Wade.

She does not consider herself a feminist "in a classical sense", saying that she believes the term is associated with being "anti-male" and "pro-abortion", but identifies as what she calls an "individual feminist". Conway has claimed that many feminists fail to accept women who are pro-life and conservative, and has claimed that they "'mainly care about what happens from the waist down... It's an insult. You know, it's [from] the waist up for me – my eyes, my ears, my head, my heart, my mouth certainly.'" She has also claimed that "nobody cared" about her experience with sexual harassment and her Me Too moment because of her political views.

Personal life
Conway is married to George T. Conway III, who is of counsel at the law firm Wachtell, Lipton, Rosen & Katz, and wrote the Supreme Court brief for Paula Jones during the Clinton impeachment in 1998. The couple have four children: twins Claudia and George IV, Charlotte, and Vanessa. Prior to Trump's presidency, they lived in Alpine, New Jersey. Prior to her marriage, Conway dated the senator and 2008 presidential candidate Fred Thompson.

Conway's husband George is a critic of Trump; in December 2019 he co-founded the Lincoln Project, which campaigned against Donald Trump's re-election from a conservative perspective. In March 2019, President Trump responded to criticism from Kellyanne's husband George by describing George as a "stone cold LOSER & husband from hell". Kellyanne defended Trump by saying that George Conway is "not a psychiatrist" and that Trump should not be expected to respond when George, "a non-medical professional accuses him of having a mental disorder".

Conway's daughter Claudia is a TikTok influencer who became known in 2020, at age 15, for her anti-Trump messages. In July 2020 she said that her parents' marriage had "failed". Claudia identifies as a leftist and liberal, and described her TikTok fan base as "leftist, A.C.A.B. (All Cops Are Bastards), anti-trump, blm (Black Lives Matter)". In August 2020, Claudia Conway announced she was seeking emancipation. In January 2021, she claimed that her mother has been "physically, mentally, and emotionally abusive," posting videos on TikTok appearing to show her mother screaming at and even once hitting her. On January 25, 2021, Conway's official Twitter account shared a topless photo of a girl later confirmed to be Claudia Conway. New Jersey police launched an investigation into the matter. At age 16, Claudia Conway appeared as a contestant on, but was eliminated from, American Idol.

In September 2019, Conway's cousin Giovanna Coia, who was then White House press assistant, married Vice President Mike Pence's nephew John Pence, who worked for the Donald Trump 2020 presidential campaign.

One of the few White House staffers to have had protection from the Secret Service due to various threats, Conway chose "Blueberry" as her Secret Service code name because of associations with the fruit from her youth in pageants and berry picking.

In a September 2018 interview with Jake Tapper on CNN, Conway stated she was the victim of a sexual assault.

On August 23, 2020, Conway announced her resignation in order to "spend more time with her family," as did her husband George, who announced he had taken time off from the Lincoln Project and Twitter.

In October 2020, Conway's daughter, Claudia, revealed on social media that her mother had tested positive for COVID-19.

In March 2023, George and Kellyanne announced that they were divorcing after 22 years of marriage.

Awards

Books
In 2005, Conway and Democratic pollster Celinda Lake co-authored What Women Really Want: How American Women Are Quietly Erasing Political, Racial, Class, and Religious Lines to Change the Way We Live (Free Press/Simon & Schuster, 2005).

In 2022, Conway authored Here's the Deal: A Memoir (Threshold Editions, 2022).

References

External links

 
 
Kellyanne Conway at Politifact

|-

1967 births
21st-century American women
American campaign managers
American feminists
American people of Irish descent
American people of Italian descent
American political consultants
American political commentators
American television personalities
American women television personalities
American women chief executives
American women lawyers
Catholics from New Jersey
Counselors to the President
Donald Trump 2016 presidential campaign
Feminist critics of feminism
George Washington University Law School alumni
Living people
New Jersey Republicans
People associated with the 2016 United States presidential election
People from Alpine, New Jersey
People from Camden, New Jersey
People from Waterford Township, New Jersey
Pollsters
St. Joseph Academy (New Jersey) alumni
Trinity Washington University alumni
Trump administration personnel